Mario Ančić and Jürgen Melzer were the defending champions, but did not participate in the tournament this year.

Seeds

Draw

Draw

External links
Doubles draw

Ordina Open - Men's Doubles
Ordina Open - Men's Doubles
Rosmalen Grass Court Championships